Peter David Monteath (born 1961) is an Australian historian and academic. He is a professor in Modern European History at Flinders University in South Australia. Monteath's research interests are in modern European and Australian history. He has a particular interest in prisoners of war, internment, and the German presence in Australia and has written extensively on these subjects.

With Jean Fornasiero and John West-Soob, Monteath co-authored Encountering Terra Australis: the Australian Voyages of Nicolas Baudin and Matthew Flinders (Wakefield Press, 2004), which won the 2004 Frank Broeze Memorial Maritime History Book Prize.

Monteath co-authored with Valerie Munt Red Professor: The Cold War Life of Fred Rose (Wakefield Press, 2015), which was shortlisted for the 2016 Prime Minister's Prize for Australian History.

Bibliography

Author

Editor

References

1961 births
Australian historians
Academic staff of Flinders University
Griffith University alumni
Living people
People from Brisbane
University of Queensland alumni
University of Siegen alumni